Rolando Crespo Arroyo (born November 9, 1974) is a former Representative of Puerto Rico and former Majority Leader of the New Progressive Party within the Puerto Rico House of Representatives who resigned in February 2011 after testing positive for cocaine in a drug test. He was replaced as Majority Leader by Carlos J. Méndez Núñez.

Personal life
Rolando Crespo Arroyo was a former Representative of Puerto Rico and former Majority Leader of the New Progressive Party within the Puerto Rico House of Representatives 

Rolando Crespo Arroyo was born in Aguadilla, Puerto Rico on November 9, 1975. He is the son of Candido Crespo and Lydia Arroyo. His father is a lawyer and his mother is a housewife. In 1999, Rolando received a Bachelor of Arts in Criminal Justice with a concentration in Sociology from the Inter American University of Puerto Rico, Aguadilla campus. In addition, studies leading to a Master's degree in Scholar Psychology.

Rolando has been married twice. His first marriage was when he was 19 years old. He has two children from that relationship. In December 2011, Crespo married entrepreneur Dr. Flor de Liz Pérez in Aguadilla.

References

Interamerican University of Puerto Rico alumni
Living people
People from Aguadilla, Puerto Rico
New Progressive Party members of the House of Representatives of Puerto Rico
Nova Southeastern University alumni
University of Puerto Rico alumni
1975 births